Sins of the Father is an original science fiction novel written by Mitchel Scanlon and based on the British comic strip Anderson:Psi Division (a spin-off from Judge Dredd) in 2000 AD. It is Scanlon's third Anderson novel.

Synopsis
Years after falling victim to a gang of child abusers, a man turns vigilante to exact his revenge. Anderson is assigned to hunt him down, but the case reawakens long-buried memories of her own tormented childhood.

Continuity
The story Engram in 2000 AD # 712-717 and # 758-763 (1991), written by Alan Grant, revealed that Anderson had been abused by her father, and that her first psionic act had been to inadvertently kill him.

External links
 Entry at FictionDB

Judge Anderson novels